is a Japanese manga series written and illustrated by Ayano Yamane. The manga is licensed in North America by Digital Manga Publishing, which released the first volume in March 2008, and in Germany by Tokyopop.  It was adapted into a two-episode OVA in 2007.

Plot
A Foreign Love Affair is about Ranmaru, the son of a yakuza mob. He marries his childhood friend yakuza daughter Kaoru-(through an arranged marriage) on an Italian cruise ship. Because they are Japanese, they are the center of attention on the boat. On their wedding night, the couple gets into a fight, and Kaoru kicks him out of their honeymoon suite. Ranmaru goes to the boat's bar and fights with some yakuza. He is assisted by Alberto Valentino, an Italian man who happens to be fluent in Japanese. To show his gratitude, Ranmaru invites Alberto to have a drink with him, which leads to the two of them having sex. The next morning, Ranmaru finds out that Alberto is the ship's captain.

Characters

 
The 3rd generation boss of his family clan. He's just recently entered a marriage of politics and convenience to a woman he's known since childhood. He's stuck on his honeymoon in Italy when he first meets Alberto. While in a confrontation with some foreign men who were cheking him out, he meets Alberto who stops the fight and tells the men about his connections to the ship; after Kaoru kicks him out of their hotel room following a violent fight between them, an embittered Ranmaru goes to the bar where he's encountered by Ryuji and his subordinates who engage in a brawl with him until Alberto intervenes and helps Ranmaru dispatch Ryuji and his men. As a thank you, Alberto invites him to stay in his private suite where Ranmaru and Alberto engage in playful foreplay and have sex together.

 
A foreigner of Italian descent who meets Ranmaru during the latter's honeymoon; Alberto is shown to be fluent in many different languages including Japanese and English. He's revealed to be the captain of the cruise ship that Ranmaru is staying on.

 
Ranmaru's childhood friend and wife.

Reception
Patricia Beard, writing for Mania Entertainment, found Alberto's capture of Ranmaru "sexy and funny", appreciating Yamane's attention to detail in the art.  Beard noted there wasn't much character development, but regarded this as being symptomatic of the romantic comedy genre of A Foreign Love Affair. Rachel Bentham, writing for Active Anime, enjoyed the sexy character designs. Leroy Douresseaux, writing for Comic Book Bin described A Foreign Love Affair as "a bawdy comedy ... with intermittent scenes of torrid sex." A reader's poll for About.com for the best yaoi of 2008 ranked A Foreign Love Affair first. Deb Aoki speculated that its popularity could be due to its setting, the characters, and Yamane's character designs and "knack for drawing very hot guys in sizzling situations".

References

External links

2004 manga
2007 anime OVAs
Digital Manga Publishing titles
Tokyopop titles
Yaoi anime and manga